Jacob Snowman (24 November 1871 – 28 February 1959) M.D., M.R.C.S. was a British doctor and mohel, notable for having reportedly circumcised Prince Charles (now Charles III) in December 1948, and possibly other members of the British nobility and Royal Family.

Snowman was the son of Abraham Snowman (1849–1918), a picture dealer, and his wife Rachel, both of whom were born in Poland. He was the older brother to both painter Isaac Snowman (1873-1947) and jeweller Emanuel Snowman (1886-1970), who married into the prominent Wartski family of jewellers and became the company chairman. Wartski has enjoyed generations of Royal patronage, supplying the Welsh gold wedding bands for Charles and the former Camilla Parker-Bowles, as well as the bands worn by Prince William and the former Kate Middleton.

John Cozijn and Robert Darby, who is an historian of the British circumcision movement, have suggested that the British Royal Family invited Rabbi Snowman ("rabbi" is an honorific commonly afforded to mohels) to circumcise the infant Prince Charles at Buckingham Palace most likely because of his extensive experience with circumcision, and perhaps because non-Jewish family physicians were deemed less familiar or adept with the procedure (which was widely performed on British middle- and upper-class male infants from the 1890s through the 1940s). Darby and Cozijn have cast doubt on claims, arising in the 1990s and widely reported after the birth of Prince George in 2013, that a Royal Family "circumcision tradition" extends back to Queen Victoria's era, or even to George I in the early 18th century, grounded in secretive Davidic or British Israelist religious tradition. It is unknown whether this putative "circumcision tradition" was continued with the birth of William in 1982, as Diana, Princess of Wales is believed to have disapproved of it.

Snowman wrote specialist articles and at least four books, including Jewish Law and Sanitary Science (1896), Clinical Surgical Diagnosis (Second English Edition, 1917),  Lenzmann's Manual of Emergencies, Medical, Surgical and Obstetric: their Pathology, Diagnosis and Treatment (1919, based upon Emergencies in Medical Practice by ), a revised Manual of Emergencies, Medical, Surgical, and Obstetric (1926), A Short History of Talmudic Medicine (with thirteen editions between 1935 and 1974), and The Surgery of Ritual Circumcision (1904). The latter book was published in at least three distinct editions, the last appearing posthumously in 1962 under the co-authorship of his son Leonard Snowman (1900-1976).

References

External links
 

20th-century British medical doctors
Circumcision
English people of Polish-Jewish descent
English Jewish writers
Mohels
1871 births
1959 deaths
Jacob